Events in the year 1905 in Argentina.

Incumbents
President: Manuel Quintana
Vice President: José Figueroa Alcorta

Governors
Buenos Aires Province: Marcelino Ugarte 
 Cordoba: José Vicente de Olmos (until month unknown)
Mendoza Province: Carlos Galigniana Segura then José Néstor Lencinas then Carlos Galigniana Segura

Vice Governors
 Buenos Aires Province: Adolfo Saldías

Events
February 4–8: Argentine Revolution of 1905
May 21: demonstration consisting of thousands of workers gathered at Constitution Square and marched from there to the Plaza Lavalle, where the concentration was attacked with bullets and sabers. 2 people are killed and 20 are injured.
August 11: attack against Quintana, while his coach went on to Government House, a man fired several times at Quintana. The president's coach continued on and the custody officers arrested the perpetrator, who was a Catalan laborer named Salvador Planas y Virelles, sympathetic anarchist who acted on his own initiative

Births
25 January – Corina del Parral,  writer, poet, singer, and composer, First Lady of Ecuador

Deaths

Bibliography 
 
 
 
 
 

 
History of Argentina (1880–1916)
Argentina
Argentina
1900s in Argentina
Years of the 20th century in Argentina